Edvard Hoem (born 10 March 1949) is a Norwegian novelist, dramatist, lyricist, psalmist and government scholar. He made his literary debut in 1969, with the poetry collection Som grønne musikantar. He was awarded the Norwegian Critics Prize for Literature in 1974 for the novel Kjærleikens ferjereiser. He was awarded the Melsom Prize in 2006,  and the Peter Dass Prize in 2007 for the novel Mors og fars historie. He received the Ibsen Prize in 2008 for the play Mikal Hetles siste ord.

Several of his books (Kjærleikens ferjereiser (1974), Prøvetid (1984), Ave Eva (1987), Mors og fars historie (2005)) have been nominated for the Nordic Council's Literature Prize, but did not win this award.

Hoem was the director of the theater, Teatret Vårt (in Molde) 1997–1999. He has translated at least eleven of Shakespeare's plays into Norwegian.

Bibliography
 Som grønne musikantar – Poems (1969)
 Landet av honning og aske – Poems (1970)
 Anna Lena – Novel (1971)
 Kvinnene langs fjorden – Play (1973)
 Kjærleikens ferjereiser – Novel (1974)
 Tusen fjordar, tusen fjell og Musikken gjennom Gleng – Play (1977)
 Gi meg de brennende hjerter 1. Melding frå Petrograd – Novel (1978)
 Der storbåra bryt – Play (1979)
 Fjerne Berlin. Gi meg de brennande hjerter 2 – Novel (1980)
 God natt Europa – Play (1982)
 Du er blitt glad i dette landet – Poems (1982)
 Lenins madame – Play (1983)
 Prøvetid – Novel (1984)
 Heimlandet Barndom – Novel (1985)
 Ave Eva – Novel (1987)
 Landkjenning Romsdal (1987)
 Sankt Olavs skrin (1989)
 Til ungdommen, Nordahl Griegs liv (1989)
 I Tom Bergmanns tid – Novel (1991)
 Engelen din, Robinson – Novel (1993)
 Olav Engelbrektsson – Opera (1993) (music: Henning Sommerro)
 I kampens hete – Essay (1994)
 Bibelhistorier – (1994)
 Meisteren og Mirjam – Play (1995)
 Tid for klage, tid for dans – Novel (1996)
 Frøken Dreyers musikkskole – Novel (2000).
 Audun Hestakorn – Play (2002)
  Eystein av Nidaros – Opera (2003) (music: Henning Sommerro)
 Roerne i Christiania – Documentary novel (2003)
 Kristuskonfigurasjonar – (2003)
 Den fattige Gud – Psalms and ballads (2003)
 Kom fram, fyrste! – Historic novel (2004)
 Mors og fars historie – novel (2005)
 Faderen. Peder Bjørnson forsvarer seg (The Father. Peder Bjørnson Defends Himself.) – biography on Bjørnstjerne Bjørnson's father (2007)
 Villskapens år (The Wild Years. The Life of Bjørnstjerne Bjørnson 1832–1875) – biography on Bjørnstjerne Bjørnson (2009)
 Vennskap i storm – Bjørnstjerne Bjørnson 1875-1892 (2010)
 Syng mig hjæm – Bjørnstjerne Bjørnson 1890-1899 (2011)
 Slåttekar i himmelen – Novel (2014)
 Bror din på prærien ["your brother on the prairie"]
 Land ingen har sett ["countries no one has seen"]
 Felemakaren ["the fiddle maker"] (2020)

Translations
Edvard Hoem's most famous retranslations (Year of translation in brackets).King Lear by William Shakespeare (1981)Romeo and Juliet by William Shakespeare (1985)The Merchant of Venice by William Shakespeare (1990)Troilus and Cressida by William Shakespeare (1993)Othello by William Shakespeare (1996)The Taming of the Shrew by William Shakespeare (1997)Richard III by William Shakespeare  (1998)Macbeth by William Shakespeare (1999)As You Like It by William Shakespeare (2000)A Dream Play by August Strindberg (2004)Henry IV, Part 1 and Henry IV, Part 2 by William Shakespeare (2008–2009)

Awards
The Sunnmøre Prize 1974 for Kjærleikens ferjereiserNorwegian Critics Prize for Literature 1974 for Kjærleikens ferjereiserPastor Alfred Andersson-Rysst Bursary 1978
Aschehoug Prize 1985
Nynorsk Literature Prize 1987 for Ave EvaDobloug Prize 1988
Melsom Prize 1988
Gyldendal's Endowment 1989
The Sarpsborg Prize 1993
Bible Prize from Norwegian Bible Society for reproduction of the bible 1995
Emmaus Prize 2004 for KrituskonfigurasjonarMelsom Prize 2006 for Mors og fars historie (Mother's and Father's Story)
Peter Dass Prize 2007 for Mors og fars historie (Mother's and Father's Story'')
Ibsen Prize 2008
Ikaros Prize
Neshornet, Klassekampen's Cultural Prize 2009
Government scholar 2012

References

External links
Edvard Hoem at Aschehoug Agency
Edvard Hoem at Forlaget Oktober

1949 births
Living people
20th-century Norwegian novelists
21st-century Norwegian novelists
Nynorsk-language writers
20th-century Norwegian poets
Norwegian male poets
Norwegian theatre directors
People from Molde
Dobloug Prize winners
Norwegian male novelists
20th-century Norwegian male writers
21st-century Norwegian male writers